The 2018 Rip Curl Pro Bells Beach was an event on the World Surf League's 2018 Men's Championship Tour. This was held from 25 March to 8 April at Bells Beach, (Victoria, Australia) and contested by 36 surfers.

Round 1

Round 2

Round 3

Round 4

Quarter finals

Semi finals

Final

References

Surfing competitions
2018 World Surf League
2018 in Australian sport
Sports competitions in Victoria (Australia)
March 2018 sports events in Australia
April 2018 sports events in Australia